Lake Clark (Dena'ina: Qizhjeh Vena) is a lake in southwest Alaska. It drains through Six Mile Lake and the Newhalen River into Iliamna Lake.

Lake Clark was named for John W. Clark, chief of the Nushagak trading post and the first American non-Native to see the lake, when an expedition financed by a weekly magazine reached it in February 1891. The Dena'ina Athabascan name is Qizjeh Vena which means "place where people gather lake". The lake is within Lake Clark National Park and Preserve.

References

Clark
Clark
Alaska Range
Lake Clark National Park and Preserve